Reinickendorf is the twelfth borough of Berlin. It encompasses the northwest of the city area, including the Berlin Tegel Airport, Lake Tegel, spacious settlements of detached houses as well as housing estates like Märkisches Viertel.

Subdivisions

Reinickendorf is split in eleven localities, population in brackets:

Reinickendorf (83,467)
Tegel (36,697)
Konradshöhe (5,960)
Heiligensee (18,053)
Frohnau (16,540)
Hermsdorf (16,644)
Waidmannslust (11,027)
Lübars (5,137)
Wittenau (25,051)
Märkisches Viertel (40,447)
Borsigwalde (6,749)

Politics

District council
The governing body of Reinickendorf is the district council (Bezirksverordnetenversammlung). It has responsibility for passing laws and electing the city government, including the mayor. The most recent district council election was held on 26 September 2021, and the results were as follows: 

! colspan=2| Party
! Lead candidate
! Votes
! %
! +/-
! Seats
! +/-
|-
| bgcolor=| 
| align=left| Christian Democratic Union (CDU)
| align=left| Michael Wegner
| 37,514
| 29.0
|  6.6
| 18
|  3
|-
| bgcolor=| 
| align=left| Social Democratic Party (SPD)
| align=left| Uwe Brockhausen
| 30,823
| 23.8
|  2.4
| 15
|  2
|-
| bgcolor=| 
| align=left| Alliance 90/The Greens (Grüne)
| align=left| Güneș Keskin
| 18,525
| 14.3
|  3.9
| 9
|  3
|-
| bgcolor=| 
| align=left| Alternative for Germany (AfD)
| align=left| Sebastian Maack
| 12,291
| 9.5
|  4.9
| 6
|  2
|-
| bgcolor=| 
| align=left| Free Democratic Party (FDP)
| align=left| David Jahn
| 9,473
| 7.3
|  0.7
| 4
| ±0
|-
| bgcolor=| 
| align=left| The Left (LINKE)
| align=left| Felix Lederle
| 6,695
| 5.2
|  0.2
| 3
| ±0
|-
| colspan=8 bgcolor=lightgrey|
|-
| bgcolor=| 
| align=left| Tierschutzpartei
| align=left| 
| 3,639
| 2.8
| New
| 0
| New
|-
| bgcolor=| 
| align=left| Free Voters
| align=left| 
| 2,785
| 2.2
| New
| 0
| New
|-
| 
| align=left| The Greys
| align=left| 
| 2,452
| 1.9
| New
| 0
| New
|-
| bgcolor=| 
| align=left| dieBasis
| align=left| 
| 1,829
| 1.4
| New
| 0
| New
|-
| bgcolor=| 
| align=left| Die PARTEI
| align=left| 
| 1,825
| 1.4
|  0.1
| 0
| ±0
|-
| 
| align=left| Tierschutz hier
| align=left| 
| 1,080
| 0.8
| New
| 0
| New
|-
| bgcolor=| 
| align=left| Ecological Democratic Party
| align=left| 
| 229
| 0.2
| New
| 0
| New
|-
| bgcolor=| 
| align=left| National Democratic Party
| align=left| 
| 146
| 0.1
|  0.3
| 0
| ±0
|-
| 
| align=left| BÄRLÄ
| align=left| 
| 134
| 0.1
| New
| 0
| New
|-
! colspan=3| Valid votes
! 129,440
! 98.8
! 
! 
! 
|-
! colspan=3| Invalid votes
! 1,525
! 1.2
! 
! 
! 
|-
! colspan=3| Total
! 130,965
! 100.0
! 
! 55
! ±0
|-
! colspan=3| Electorate/voter turnout
! 194,688
! 67.3
!  4.4
! 
! 
|-
| colspan=8| Source: Elections Berlin
|}

District government
The district mayor (Bezirksbürgermeister) is elected by the Bezirksverordnetenversammlung, and positions in the district government (Bezirksamt) are apportioned based on party strength. Uwe Brockhausen of the SPD was elected mayor on 24 November 2021. Since the 2021 municipal elections, the composition of the district government is as follows:

Twin towns – sister cities

Reinickendorf is twinned with:

 Antony, France (1966)
 Bad Steben, Germany (1988)
 Blomberg, Germany (1990)
 Greenwich (London), England, United Kingdom (1966)
 Kiryat Ata, Israel (1976)
 Melle, Germany (1988)
 Vogelsberg (district), Germany (1964)

Notable people
 Anne Julia Hagen, Miss Germany 2010
 Thomas Häßler (born 1966), footballer
 Reinhard Mey, Musician
 Andreas Neuendorf, footballer
 Robert Russ, music producer, Grammy winner 2018
 Marie Schlei, politician
 Frank Steffel, politician

See also

Berlin-Reinickendorf (electoral district)

References

External links

Official homepage 
Official homepage of Berlin

 
Districts of Berlin
Former boroughs of Berlin